Well Done, Henry is a 1936 British comedy film directed by Wilfred Noy and starring Will Fyffe, Cathleen Nesbitt and Charles Hawtrey. It was made at the Cricklewood Studios in London. The film's art direction was by Duncan Sutherland.

Cast

References

Bibliography
Wood, Linda. British Films, 1927–1939. British Film Institute, 1986.

External links
 

1936 films
1936 comedy films
British comedy films
Films shot at Cricklewood Studios
Films directed by Wilfred Noy
British black-and-white films
1930s English-language films
1930s British films